Cardiorespiratory fitness (CRF) refers to the ability of the circulatory and respiratory systems to supply oxygen to skeletal muscles during sustained physical activity. Scientists and researchers use CRF to assess the functional capacity of the respiratory and cardiovascular systems. These functions include ventilation, perfusion, gas exchange, vasodilation, and delivery of oxygen to the body's tissues. As these body's functions are vital to an individual's health, CRF allows observers to quantify an individual's morbidity and mortality risk as a function of cardiorespiratory health. There are a multitude of ways scientists have developed to measure and estimate an individual's cardiovascular and respiratory fitness. One such way is using an exercise stress test, either treadmill or cycling, that entails using a graded-intensity aerobic stress to assess whether or not an individual can maintain physical exertion up to a heart rate of 85% of their age-predicted maximum. Another method of estimating CRF entails using formulas, derived from extrapolated regressive analyses, to predict a theoretical level of CRF. These formulas take into consideration an individual's age, sex, BMI, substance use, relative levels of physical activity, and pathologic co-morbidites. In 2016, Nauman and Nes et al. demonstrated the added and unique utility of estimated cardiorespiratory fitness (eCRF) in predicting risk of cardiovascular disease and all-cause mortality. The emergence of a gold-standard method to quantify CRF began in 1923-1924. A.V. Hill et al. proposed a multifactorial relationship between the maximum rate of oxygen uptake by body tissues, termed VO2 max, and intensity of physical activity dependent upon and limited by functional capacities of an individual's cardiovascular and respiratory systems. This proposal served as an impetus for a multitude of studies demonstrating a relationship between VO2 max and cardiovascular disease (CVD) and all-cause mortality. While many methods of estimating CRF exist, each has been validated as a vital tool for predicting morbidity and mortality risk. In fact, in 2016, the American Heart Association published an official scientific statement advocating that CRF be categorized as a clinical vital sign and should be routinely assessed as part of clinical practice.

Regular exercise makes these systems more efficient by enlarging the heart muscle, enabling more blood to be pumped with each stroke, and increasing the number of small arteries in trained skeletal muscles, which supply more blood to working muscles. Exercise improves not just  the respiratory system but the heart by increasing the amount of oxygen that is inhaled and distributed to body tissue. A 2005 Cochrane review demonstrated that physical activity interventions are effective for increasing cardiovascular fitness.

There are many benefits of cardiorespiratory fitness. It can reduce the risk of heart disease, lung cancer, type 2 diabetes, stroke, and other diseases. Cardiorespiratory fitness helps improve lung and heart condition, and increases feelings of wellbeing. Additionally, there is mounting evidence that CRF is potentially a stronger predictor of mortality than other established risk factors such as smoking, hypertension, high cholesterol, and type 2 diabetes. 
One study concluded that levels of CRF were associated with deaths earlier than 65 years of age which was not detected in preceding generations, suggesting low CRF might be an emerging risk factor for early death among among US Baby Boomers and Generation Xers. Significantly, CRF can be added to these traditional risk factors to improve risk prediction validity.

The American College of Sports Medicine recommends aerobic exercise 3–5 times per week for 30–60 minutes per session, at a moderate intensity, that maintains the heart rate between 65 and 85% of the maximum heart rate.

Cardiovascular system adaptations
The cardiovascular system responds to changing demands on the body by adjusting cardiac output, blood flow, and blood pressure. Cardiac output is defined as the product of heart rate and stroke volume which represents the volume of blood being pumped by the heart each minute. Cardiac output increases during physical activity due to an increase in both the heart rate and stroke volume. Stroke volume is defined as the percent of blood pumped out of the heart during systole and is a function of the heart's contractility, preload, and afterload. Contractility refers to the strength capacity of the heart muscle during systole. At rest, the basal level of autonomic nervous system activity, the length of cardiac sarcomere, and the metabolite environment of the myofibril determine the vigor with which the heart muscle can contract. Of these, during physical activity, the level of the autonomic nervous system activity is the most modifiable. During the early stages of physical activity, the parasympathetic arm of the autonomic nervous system decreases its rate of firing, followed by an increase in firing rate of the sympathetic nervous system. "Within a second after muscular contraction, there is a withdrawal of vagal outflow to the heart, which is followed by an increase in sympathetic stimulation of the heart. This results in an increase in cardiac output to ensure that blood flow to the muscle is matched to the metabolic needs". The relative and absolute increases in sympathetic nervous system activity during physical activity increase noradrenaline release to increase both heart rate and the amount of ionized calcium released in the sarcoplasmic reticulum. This increase in ionized calcium concentration principally drives the increase in myocardial contractile strength during physical activity, allowing the heart to pump more blood out to the body compared with resting conditions. Physical activity not only drives an increase in myocardial strength but also increases the amount of blood that fills the heart during diastole, namely an increase in the heart's preload. During activity, the respiratory system adapts, in part, by allowing the body to take deeper breaths. With each deep breath and subsequent expansion of the lungs and ribcage, the pressures within the right atrium and right ventricle of the heart decrease. Since the right atrium and right ventricle are anatomically located distal to the superior and inferior vena cava, the blood pressure within these venous structures increases relative to the right-side of the heart, and Bernoulli's Principle dictates an increase in blood flow from the vena cava to the heart, thus increasing the heart's preload. This increase in preload drives an even further increase in cardiac contractility, independent of ionized calcium-driven mechanisms, a phenomenon governed by the Frank-Starling Law. Both heart rate and stroke volume vary directly with the intensity of the exercise performed and many improvements can be made through continuous training.

Another important issue is the regulation of blood flow during exercise. Blood flow must increase in order to provide the working muscle with more oxygenated blood which can be accomplished through neural and chemical regulation. This increase in blood flow depends on two factors: increasing the amount of blood pumped out of the heart and disproportionately distributing blood flow to tissues under physical demand. Blood vessels are under sympathetic tone; therefore, the release of noradrenaline and adrenaline will cause vasoconstriction of non-essential tissues such as the liver, intestines, and kidneys, and decrease neurotransmitter release to the active muscles promoting vasodilatation. Also, chemical factors such as a decrease in oxygen concentration and an increase in carbon dioxide or lactic acid concentration in the blood promote vasodilatation to increase blood flow. As a result of increased vascular resistance, blood pressure rises throughout exercise and stimulates baroreceptors in the carotid arteries and aortic arch. "These pressure receptors are important since they regulate arterial blood pressure around an elevated systemic pressure during exercise".

Respiratory system adaptations
Although all of the described adaptations in the body to maintain homeostatic balance during exercise are very important, the most essential factor is the involvement of the respiratory system. The respiratory system allows for the proper exchange and transport of gases to and from the lungs while being able to control the ventilation rate through neural and chemical impulses. In addition, the body is able to efficiently use the three energy systems which include the phosphagen system, the glycolytic system, and the oxidative system.

Temperature regulation
In most cases as the body is exposed to physical activity, the core temperature of the body tends to rise as heat gain becomes larger than the amount of heat lost. "The factors that contribute to heat gain during exercise include anything that stimulate metabolic rate, anything from the external environment that causes heat gain, and the ability of the body to dissipate heat under any given set of circumstances". In response to an increase in core temperature, there are a variety of factors which adapt in order to help restore heat balance. The main physiological response to an increase in body temperature is mediated by the thermal regulatory center located in the hypothalamus of the brain which connects to thermal receptors and effectors. There are numerous thermal effectors including sweat glands, smooth muscles of blood vessels, some endocrine glands, and skeletal muscle. With an increase in the core temperature, the thermal regulatory center will stimulate the arterioles supplying blood to the skin to dilate along with the release of sweat on the skin surface to reduce temperature through evaporation. In addition to the involuntary regulation of temperature, the hypothalamus is able to communicate with the cerebral cortex to initiate voluntary control such as removing clothing or drinking cold water. With all regulations taken into account, the body is able to maintain core temperature within about two or three degrees Celsius during exercise.

See also
 Aerobic conditioning
 Central governor
 Physical fitness
 Exercise physiology
 VO2 max

References

Cardiovascular physiology
Respiratory physiology
Physical fitness